Razabad may refer to:
 Rezaabad-e Sharqi
 Rezaabad, Khenaman